Franklyn Wood Fisher (January 1, 1901 – April 23, 1983) was a Canadian ice hockey player who competed in the 1928 Winter Olympics.

In 1928, he was a member of the University of Toronto Grads, the Canadian team which won the gold medal.

External links
profile

1901 births
1983 deaths
Canadian ice hockey players
Ice hockey players at the 1928 Winter Olympics
Medalists at the 1928 Winter Olympics
Olympic gold medalists for Canada
Olympic ice hockey players of Canada
Olympic medalists in ice hockey
Toronto Varsity Blues ice hockey players